The University of Newcastle upon Tyne Faculty of Science, Agriculture and Engineering (SAgE) is a faculty of Newcastle University. It was established in the city of Newcastle upon Tyne as the College of Physical Science in 1871, for the teaching of physical sciences, and was part of Durham University. It existed until 1937, when it joined the College of Medicine to form King's College, Durham.

The Faculty is structured around five academic Schools, four Research Institutes and a number of Research Centres and Networks. The Faculty also leads Newcastle University's campus in Singapore.

Schools 

In its current form, the Faculty of Science, Agriculture and Engineering contains five schools:

 School of Computing
 School of Engineering
 School of Mathematics, Statistics and Physics
 School of Natural and Environmental Sciences
 Newcastle University in Singapore

Research and degrees 
The faculty offers over sixty undergraduate degrees, postgraduate degrees and research opportunities. Research funding sources include:

 The Biotechnology and Biological Sciences Research Council (BBSRC)
 The Natural Environment Research Council (NERC)
 The Engineering and Physical Sciences Research Council (EPSRC)
 The Science and Technology Facilities Council (STFC)
 The European Union
 The Environment Agency
 The Department for the Environment, Food and Rural Affairs (DEFRA)
 The Royal Society

References

External links 
 Faculty of Science, Agriculture and Engineering at Newcastle University
 SAgE Research Directory at Newcastle University

Educational institutions established in 1871
Faculty of Science, Agriculture and Engineering
Agricultural universities and colleges in the United Kingdom
1871 establishments in England

ar:مدرسة طب جامعة نيوكاسل